Amitava Roy (born 1 March 1953) is the retired judge of the Supreme Court of India and former Chief Justice of the Odisha High Court and Rajasthan High Court. He is also a puisne judge of the Gauhati High Court.

Elevation
Elevated as the Judge of the High Court on 4 February 2002. He was administered the oath of office of the Chief Justice of Rajasthan High Court on 2 January 2013 by Margaret Alva The Governor of Rajasthan.
Took oath as Supreme Court Judge, in February 2015.

Notable Judgements

National Anthem
A judgement of a two judge bench of the Supreme Court of India, which included Roy and Dipak Misra, made it compulsory for cinema halls across India to play the National Anthem of India before the screening of any film, and mandated that the audience stand while the National Anthem was played. The verdict has been widely criticized for being an assault on civil liberties and individual rights in India. It was pointed out that the ruling contravened an earlier judgement of the Indian Supreme Court in which children in India claiming religious allegiance to Jehovah's Witnesses were permitted to refrain from singing the National Anthem during school assemblies in accordance with their religious rights.

Following this order, Indian police has started arresting moviegoers who fail to stand when the National Anthem is played in cinema halls in India. It has been clarified that foreigners in India are not exempt from the new law.

Notes

References

External links
 Profile, Rajasthan High Court

1953 births
Living people
Justices of the Supreme Court of India
Chief Justices of the Rajasthan High Court
20th-century Indian judges
Chief Justices of the Orissa High Court
21st-century Indian judges
Indian judges